Älmsta or Elmsta is a locality situated in Norrtälje Municipality, Stockholm County, Sweden. It had 924 inhabitants in 2005 and 1,097 in 2010. Elmsta is the old Swedish name, which has become more popular again (e.g. names of stores), while Älmsta still is the official name.

The canal has been rebuilt on several occasions since and is still used by some 22,000 boats annually. Part of Älmsta lies on the island of Väddö, separated from the mainland by the canal.

References 

Populated places in Norrtälje Municipality